Klaus Lanzarini (born 18 January 1977 in Latina) is a former international freestyle swimmer from Italy, who participated at the 2000 Summer Olympics for his native country. He is best known for winning the gold medal in the men's 4 × 100 m freestyle at the 2006 FINA Short Course World Championships in Shanghai, PR China.

References

1977 births
Living people
Swimmers at the 2000 Summer Olympics
Olympic swimmers of Italy
Italian male freestyle swimmers
Medalists at the FINA World Swimming Championships (25 m)